José Uriburu may refer to:

José Evaristo Uriburu, President of Argentina, 1895-98
José Félix Uriburu, President of Argentina 1930–32, nephew of José Evaristo
José C. Uriburu, interventor of the Argentine province of Córdoba